Stenoma lapilella is a moth in the family Depressariidae. It was described by August Busck in 1914. It is found in Panama and Brazil.

References

Moths described in 1914
Stenoma